We Will Rock You is a concert film by English band Queen. It was filmed in Montreal, Quebec, Canada at the Montreal Forum on 24 and 25 November 1981.

A new official release of the concert (retitled Queen Rock Montreal) digitally restored and remastered by Queen was released on 29 October 2007 on DVD (by Eaglevision), double CD (by Hollywood Records for the US and Canada and by Parlophone Records for Europe and EMI for the rest of the world) and triple vinyl LP.

A special double DVD Queen Rock Montreal & Live Aid included Queen's performance at Live Aid as well as never before seen interviews and rehearsal footage. HD-DVD and Blu-ray versions were released on 4 December 2007.

List of songs 
 "We Will Rock You" (fast) (May)
 "Let Me Entertain You" (Mercury)
 "Play the Game" (Mercury)
 "Somebody to Love" (Mercury)
 "Killer Queen" (Mercury)
 "I'm in Love with My Car" (Taylor)
 "Get Down, Make Love" (Mercury)
 "Save Me" (May)
 "Now I'm Here" (May)
 "Dragon Attack" (May)
 "Now I'm Here" (reprise) (May)
 "Love of My Life" (Mercury)
 "Under Pressure" (Queen/Bowie) - First live performance of the song
 "Keep Yourself Alive" (with impromptu jam before the song) (May)
 Drum Solo/Tympani Solo (Queen/Taylor)
 Guitar Solo/Guitar and Drum Duel (May)
 "Crazy Little Thing Called Love" (Mercury)
 "Jailhouse Rock" (Leiber, Stoller)
 "Bohemian Rhapsody" (Mercury)
 "Tie Your Mother Down" (May)
 "Another One Bites the Dust" (Deacon)
 "Sheer Heart Attack" (Taylor)
 "We Will Rock You" (May)
 "We Are the Champions" (Mercury)
 "God Save the Queen" (tape) (arr. May)

The tracks "Flash" and "The Hero" (both written by May) were also performed at these concerts but were deleted from the film. However, the tracks do appear on the CD and vinyl issues of Queen Rock Montreal. A commentary by Roger Taylor and Brian May is an optional feature of Queen Rock Montreal whereas a commentary by Saul Swimmer (the director/producer) was an optional feature of the DVD re-release of We Will Rock You.

Track listing (Double disc Live Aid footage)

Live Aid 
 "Bohemian Rhapsody"
 "Radio Ga Ga"
 "Hammer To Fall"
 "Crazy Little Thing Called Love"
 "We Will Rock You"
 "We Are The Champions"
 "Is This The World We Created"

 all tracks recorded live at Wembley Stadium, 13 July 1985.

Commentaries 
Director Saul Swimmer recorded a commentary for the original laserdisc release of the concert. In it, he describes the process by which he and the band went about organising and recording the concerts which eventually became this film. He is complimentary of the band and spoke positively about the experience. Specifically, he talked about the lengths he went to convince the band to make the film at the end of their then-current tour. Swimmer said the deciding moment came when he took Freddie Mercury to the Smithsonian in Washington, D.C. and showed him the three-storey IMAX screen, and told him to imagine himself five stories tall. Having convinced Mercury, the rest of the band followed suit.

When Queen eventually acquired the rights to the film, Brian May and Roger Taylor recorded a new commentary track, on which they discuss their feelings about the original process of making the concert film. May describes Swimmer's behaviour in trying to get the band to agree to the project in very negative terms. He says the director effectively hounded them and that when they relented, he was not easy to work with during the actual two nights of filming. Unlike Swimmer's earlier commentary track, which paints a generous picture of the relationship between himself and the band, May and Taylor's commentary track indicates very directly that this was not the case. In particular, May was irked by Swimmer's camera direction and raised this point every time he wasn't in shot during a guitar solo.

Production 
Material from both nights has been used in the final version. In a number of instances, the footage is a mixture of camera shots from one night and audio recordings from the other night. It was finally released in 2007 this time with permission of the band. The title was also changed. Queen Rock Montreal was chosen as the new official title.

Video releases 
The concert was filmed in high quality 35mm format, but the VHS releases of the 1980's and 1990's were highly degraded versions of the original which contained notable syncing issues. Because the original film rights were 100% controlled by the production company there was little the band could do to prevent the various releases, not regaining the film rights until the early 2000's.

In most of the world, the video was released and re-released at various points from 1982 to 1992 in many popular formats of the day such as VHS, Betamax, Laserdisc and V2000. Cover art varied from territory to territory and from release to release. In the US, however, it was not released until 1986 and was edited down to include only 11 songs, instead of 21, and included vastly different cover art than had been previously used elsewhere. It was not until 1992 that a full, 21-song version was released in the US, with a portion of the proceeds benefitting the Magic Johnson AIDS Foundation. The cover art was more similar to that of other territories.

Then in 1997, 1998 and 1999, a Commemorative Edition was released throughout the world on VHS, Laserdisc and DVD with completely redesigned cover art (a blue/green background with Freddie's silhouette in black), and included Queen performing the Elvis Presley song "Jailhouse Rock", which had not been included in previous releases. Queen performed this song on many occasions throughout their career, but this was the first time an official Queen release included a performance of the song. This was also first ever commercially available Queen release on DVD.

The concert film was again re-released in 2001 on DVD and VHS, remastered in THX for enhanced audio and video quality. The cover art was again majorly redesigned and there were very noticeable improvements in sound and picture quality. It was also made available in a DTS Surround Sound edition. This was the last time it was released under the title We Will Rock You, as subsequent releases in 2007 and onward were retitled Rock Montreal or Rock Montreal and Live Aid.

Charts and certifications

Charts

Certifications

References

External links 
 Official Site

Queen (band) video albums
Hollywood Records video albums

it:We Will Rock You (VHS)